In gravitational theory, the Bondi–Metzner–Sachs (BMS) group, or the Bondi–van der Burg–Metzner–Sachs group, is an asymptotic symmetry group of asymptotically flat, Lorentzian spacetimes at null (i.e., light-like) infinity. It was originally formulated in 1962 by Hermann Bondi, M. G. van der Burg, A. W. Metzner and Rainer K. Sachs in order to investigate the flow of energy at infinity due to propagating gravitational waves.  Half a century later, this work of Bondi, van der Burg, Metzner, and Sachs is considered pioneering and seminal.  In his autobiography, Bondi considered the 1962 work as his "best scientific work".

1962 work of Bondi, van der Burg, Metzner, and Sachs
To give some context for the general reader, the naive expectation for asymptotically flat spacetime symmetries, i.e., symmetries of spacetime seen by observers located far away from all sources of the gravitational field, might be to extend and reproduce the symmetries of flat spacetime of special relativity, viz., the Poincaré group, which is a ten-dimensional group of three Lorentz boosts, three rotations, and four spacetime translations. 

Expectations aside, the first step in the work of Bondi, van der Burg, Metzner, and Sachs was to decide on some physically sensible boundary conditions to place on the gravitational field at light-like infinity to characterize what it means to say a metric is asymptotically flat, with no a priori assumptions made about the nature of the asymptotic symmetry group — not even the assumption that such a group exists.  Then after artfully designing what they considered to be the most sensible boundary conditions, they investigated the nature of the resulting asymptotic symmetry transformations that leave invariant the form of the boundary conditions appropriate for asymptotically flat gravitational fields. What they found was that the asymptotic symmetry transformations actually do form a group and the structure of this group does not depend on the particular gravitational field that happens to be present. This means that, as expected, one can separate the kinematics of spacetime from the dynamics of the gravitational field at least at spatial infinity. The puzzling surprise in 1962 was their discovery of a rich infinite-dimensional group (the so-called BMS group) as the asymptotic symmetry group, instead of the finite-dimensional Poincaré group, which is a subgroup of the BMS group. Not only are the Lorentz transformations asymptotic symmetry transformations, there are also additional transformations that are not Lorentz transformations but are asymptotic symmetry transformations. In fact, they found an additional infinity of transformation generators known as supertranslations. This implies that General Relativity (GR) does not reduce to special relativity in the case of weak fields at long distances. 

The coordinates used in the 1962 formulation were those introduced by Bondi and generalized by Sachs, which focused on null (i.e., light-like) geodesics, called null rays, along which the gravitational waves traveled.  The null rays form a null hypersurface, defined by the retarded time  for outgoing waves and advanced time  for incoming waves.  The basic idea, which was novel then, was to use the family of outgoing (or incoming) null hypersurfaces to build spacetime coordinates that would describe outgoing (or incoming) gravitational waves. In addition to the retarded (or advanced) time are the space-like distance  and the null-ray direction  to complete the local spacetime coordinates . As  is large and approaches infinity, the set of  null hypersurfaces form the future null infinity, where the outgoing gravitational waves "exit". Similar considerations of  null hypersurfaces as  goes to infinity yield the past null infinity, where the incoming gravitational waves "enter". These two null (i.e., light-like) infinities, found using the non-inertial Bondi-Sachs coordinates, are not obvious in the inertial Cartesian coordinates of flat spacetime, where the two time-like infinities and the space-like infinity are obvious. All five infinities are revealed in the asymptotic conformal treatment of infinity by Penrose, where the future (or past) null infinity is denoted by script  (or script ) and  pronounced "scri plus" (or "scri minus").

As  can be expanded as an infinite series of spherical harmonics, it was shown that the first four terms reproduce the four ordinary spacetime translations, which form a subgroup of the supertranslations. In other words, supertranslations are direction-dependent time translations on the boundary of asymptotically flat spacetimes and includes the ordinary spacetime translations. 

Abstractly, the BMS group is an infinite-dimensional extension of the Poincaré group and shares a similar structure: just as the Poincaré group is a semidirect product between the Lorentz group and the four-dimensional Abelian group of spacetime translations, the BMS group is a semidirect product of the Lorentz group with an infinite-dimensional Abelian group of  spacetime supertranslations. The translation group is a normal subgroup of the supertranslation group.

Recent developments
The recent surge of renewed interest in the study of this asymptotic symmetry group of General Relativity (GR) is  due in part to the advent of gravitational-wave astronomy (the hope of which prompted the pioneering 1962 studies) as well as Strominger’s observation that BMS symmetry, suitably modified, could be seen as a restatement of the universal soft graviton theorem in quantum field theory (QFT), which relates universal infrared (soft) QFT with GR asymptotic spacetime symmetries.

As of May 2020, whether the GR asymptotic symmetry group should be larger or smaller than the original BMS group is a subject of debate, since various further extensions have been proposed in the literature — most notably one where the Lorentz group is also extended into an infinite-dimensional group of so-called superrotations. 

The enhancement of spacetime translations into infinite-dimensional supertranslations, viewed in 1962 with consternation, is now considered a key feature of BMS symmetry, partly owing to the fact that imposing supertranslation invariance (using a smaller BMS group acting only on the future or past null infinity) on S-matrix elements involving gravitons yields Ward identities that turn out to be equivalent to Weinberg's 1965 soft graviton theorem. In fact, such a relation between asymptotic symmetries and soft QFT theorems is not specific to gravitation alone, but is rather a general property of gauge theories. As a result, and following proposals according to which asymptotic symmetries could explain the microscopic origin of black hole entropy, BMS symmetry and its extensions as well as its gauge-theoretic cousins are subjects of active research as of May 2020.

References

External links
 Thomas Mädler and Jeffrey Winicour (2016): "Bondi-Sachs Formalism", Scholarpedia, 11(12):33528.

Gravitational waves
Symmetry
Mathematical methods in general relativity
Lorentzian manifolds